Johann Peter Rupert (born 1 June 1950) is a South African billionaire businessman, who is the eldest son of business tycoon Anton Rupert and his wife Huberte. He is the chairman of the Swiss-based luxury-goods company Richemont and the South Africa-based company Remgro. Since April 2010, he has been the CEO of Compagnie Financiere Richemont. Rupert and family were ranked second-richest in South Africa on the 2021 Forbes list, with an estimated net worth of US$7.1 billion.

Personal life
Rupert grew up in Stellenbosch, where he attended Paul Roos Gymnasium and the University of Stellenbosch, studying economics and company law. He dropped out of the university to pursue a career in business, however, in 2004, the university awarded him an honorary doctorate in Economics.

In 2008, he was awarded an honorary doctorate from Nelson Mandela Metropolitan University. Described as "reclusive" by the Financial Times and Barron's, Rupert rarely gives interviews and shuns public events. In 2006 the same newspaper also called him "Rupert the Bear" for predicting a world economic crisis.

Rupert has declared his sympathy for and belief in the idea of a universal basic income.

Business career
Rupert served his business apprenticeship in New York City, where he worked for Chase Manhattan for two years and for Lazard Freres for three years. He then returned to South Africa in 1979 and founded Rand Merchant Bank of which he was CEO.

 1984: Merged RMB and Rand Consolidated Investments, forming RMB Holdings, and left to join his father's company, the Rembrandt Group.
 1988 Founded Compagnie Financiere Richemont in 1988 and was appointed Non-Executive Director of Rothmans International plc in 1988. He was named "Businessman of the Year" by the Sunday Times in the same year.
 1989: Appointed Vice Chairman of the Rembrandt Group.
 1990: Named business leader of the year by Die Burger newspaper and the Cape Town Chamber of Commerce. Formed Richemont subsidiary Vendôme Luxury Group SA.
 1991: Appointed Chairman of Rembrandt Group Limited and in 1992 he was named one of 200 "Global Leaders of Tomorrow" by the World Economic Forum, Davos, Switzerland.
 1993: Received the M.S. Louw Award from the A.H.I. ("Afrikaanse Handelsinstituut").
 1996: Named Sunday Times Business Times's Businessman of the Year for second time.
 1997: Appointed Non-Executive Chairman of Gold Fields South Africa Ltd.
 1999: Awarded the 1999 Free Market Award by The Free Market Foundation of South Africa.
 2000: Restructured Rembrandt Group Limited and formed Remgro Limited and VenFin Limited. Appointed Chairman and Chief Executive of Compagnie Financière Richemont SA. Voted "Most influential Business Leader" in South Africa by CEOs of top 100 Listed Companies
 2004: Awarded an Honorary Doctorate in Economics by the University of Stellenbosch.
 2008 Voted South Africa's Business Leader of the Year by the CEOs of the Top 100 Companies, for the third time.
 2009 Appointed "Officier" of the French "Ordre National de la Légion d’Honneur" by the President of the French Republic

Selected as the 2009 International Wine Entrepreneur of the Year at the Meininger "Excellence in Wine and Spirit" awards ceremony in Düsseldorf, Germany.

 2009: Appointed Chancellor of Stellenbosch University
 2010 Made Honorary Vice President of the European Golf Tour

Awarded honorary doctorate by the University of St Andrews, Scotland

Other interests
Rupert is a former cricketer and founded the Laureus Sport for Good Foundation in 1990. Laureus funds 65 projects globally, with the goal of using sport to tackle social issues, having a particular emphasis on underprivileged children. He co-founded the Sports Science Institute with his friends Morne du Plessis and Tim Noakes.
Rupert also developed the Gary Player designed, Leopard Creek Golf Club in Mpumalanga, South Africa which is one of South Africa's top three golf courses, and rated number 25 outside the United States of America (Golf Digest). He has also played in the annual Gary Player Invitational golf tournament to assist fellow South African and friend Gary Player raise funds for various children's charities. He serves as Chairman of the South African PGA Tour and Chairman of the South African Golf Development Board. In 2007 he was elected into South African Sports Hall of Fame and in 2009 was inducted into South African Golf Hall of Fame.

Following his younger brother Anthonij's death in a car accident in 2001 he took over the L'Ormarins wine estate. Anthonij, was head of Rupert & Rothschild Vignerons. Rupert initiated a project to enhance the farm in memory of his late brother.

He was council member of The South Africa Foundation and trustee of the Southern African Nature Foundation, The Institute of Directors in Southern Africa, Business South Africa and Die Suid-Afrikaanse Akademie vir Wetenskap en Kuns and Managing Trustee and member of the investment committee, Nelson Mandela Children's Fund. He served on the Daimler Chrysler International Advisory Board.

Following in the footsteps of his father, Anton, Johann Rupert is also a committed conservationist. In addition to conserving about 25,000 hectares in the Graaff Reinet area, he is also Chairman of the Peace Parks Foundation.

Controversies

When the British design magazine Wallpaper* described the Afrikaans language as  "one of the ugliest languages in the world"  in its September 2005 edition (in reference to the Afrikaans Language Monument), Rupert responded by withdrawing advertising for his companies' brands such as Cartier, Van Cleef & Arpels, Montblanc and Alfred Dunhill from the magazine.

In December 2016, it was reported that Rupert had dropped Bell Pottinger as the PR agency of Richemont, accusing Bell Pottinger of running a social media campaign against him, to divert attention away from persistent 'state capture' allegations levelled at the Gupta family.

In September 2017, Rupert, during Richemont’s annual general meeting in Geneva, described the use of the term "Radical Economic Transformation" by Bell Pottinger as "just a code word for theft”, in order to cover up the "State Capture" by their clients, the notorious Gupta family. Radical Economic Transformation is a policy championed by President Jacob Zuma to reduce racial inequality in South Africa.

In 2018 Rupert caused some controversy in South Africa for comments he made during an interview with PowerFM. He was criticised for denying the alleged existence of white monopoly capital, his account of the process of Afrikaner economic-upliftment, and for comments he made regarding the saving habits of black South Africans.  Following the incident Rupert issued an apology for his comments. The controversial leader of the Black First Land First party Andile Mngxitama stated afterwards that Rupert's comments were a reason to commit violence against white South Africans.

See also
 List of South African billionaires by net worth

References

Richemont people
Afrikaner people
South African people of Dutch descent
South African businesspeople
South African billionaires
South African conservationists
Stellenbosch University alumni
Alumni of Paul Roos Gymnasium
1950 births
Living people
People from Stellenbosch